Variety Studio: Actors on Actors, also referred to as Actors on Actors, is an American entertainment talk show television series co-produced by PBS SoCal and Variety Media. It premiered December 21, 2014 on PBS SoCal.

Plot 

Each episode brings together multiple pairs of actors engaging in intimate one-on-one discussions about their acting craft and work.

Episodes

Season 1 (2014–15)

Episode 1:
 Benedict Cumberbatch (The Imitation Game) with Edward Norton (Birdman)
 Patricia Arquette (Boyhood) with Jake Gyllenhaal (Nightcrawler)
 Hilary Swank (The Homesman) with Tilda Swinton (Snowpiercer)
 Oscar Isaac (A Most Violent Year) with Gugu Mbatha-Raw (Belle)

Episode 2:

 Jessica Chastain (Interstellar) with Mark Ruffalo (Foxcatcher)
 Laura Dern (Wild) with Eddie Redmayne (The Theory of Everything)
 Josh Brolin (Inherent Vice) with J. K. Simmons (Whiplash)
 James Corden (Into the Woods) with Kevin Costner (Black or White)

Episode 3:

 Michael Keaton (Birdman) with Reese Witherspoon (Wild)
 Ethan Hawke (Boyhood) with Keira Knightley (The Imitation Game)
 Jack O'Connell (Unbroken) with David Oyelowo (Selma)
 Felicity Jones (The Theory of Everything) with Jenny Slate (Obvious Child)

Episode 4:

 Jennifer Aniston (Cake) with Emily Blunt (Into the Woods)
 Ralph Fiennes (The Grand Budapest Hotel) with Christoph Waltz (Big Eyes)
 Marion Cotillard (Two Days, One Night) with Timothy Spall (Mr. Turner)
 Chadwick Boseman (Get on Up) with Logan Lerman (Fury)

Season 2 (2015)

Episode 1:
 Julia Louis-Dreyfus (Veep) with Jeffrey Tambor (Transparent)
 Taraji P. Henson (Empire) with Queen Latifah (Bessie)
 Jessica Lange (American Horror Story) with Taylor Schilling (Orange Is the New Black)
 Maggie Gyllenhaal (The Honourable Woman) with Liev Schreiber (Ray Donovan)
 Bob Odenkirk (Better Call Saul) with Michael Sheen (Masters of Sex)

Episode 2:
 Don Cheadle (House of Lies) with Claire Danes (Homeland)
 Jesse Tyler Ferguson (Modern Family) with Matt LeBlanc (Episodes)
 Julianna Margulies (The Good Wife) with Clive Owen (The Knick)
 Viola Davis (How to Get Away with Murder) with Jane Fonda (Grace and Frankie)
 Uzo Aduba (Orange is the New Black) with Gina Rodriguez (Jane the Virgin)

Season 3 (2015–16)

Episode 1:
 Cate Blanchett (Carol and Truth) with Ian McKellen (Mr. Holmes)
 Benicio Del Toro (Sicario) with Will Smith (Concussion)
 Joel Edgerton (Black Mass) with Brie Larson (Room)
 Amy Schumer (Trainwreck) with Lily Tomlin (Grandma)

Episode 2:
 Saoirse Ronan (Brooklyn) with Kate Winslet (Steve Jobs)
 Elizabeth Banks (Love & Mercy) with Carey Mulligan (Suffragette)
 Steve Carell (The Big Short) with Rooney Mara (Carol)
 Bryan Cranston (Trumbo) with Jason Segel (The End of the Tour)

Episode 3:

 Jennifer Jason Leigh (The Hateful Eight) with Seth Rogen (Steve Jobs)
 Samuel L. Jackson (The Hateful Eight) with Michael Keaton (Spotlight)
 Paul Dano (Love & Mercy) with Joseph Gordon-Levitt (The Walk)
 Charlotte Rampling (45 Years) with Isabella Rossellini (Joy)

Season 4 (2016)
Episode 1:
 Jamie Lee Curtis (Scream Queens) with Lady Gaga (American Horror Story: Hotel)
 Tracee Ellis Ross (Black-ish) with Courtney B. Vance (American Crime Story)
 Felicity Huffman (American Crime) with Jennifer Lopez (Shades of Blue)
 Tom Hiddleston (The Night Manager) with Aaron Paul (The Path)
 Emilia Clarke (Game of Thrones) with Jay Duplass (Transparent)

Episode 2:
 Bobby Cannavale (Vinyl) with Sarah Paulson (American Crime Story)
 Rob Lowe (The Grinder) with John Travolta (American Crime Story)
 Aziz Ansari (Master of None) with Kerry Washington (Confirmation)
 Kirsten Dunst (Fargo) with Rami Malek (Mr. Robot)
 Thomas Middleditch (Silicon Valley) with Patrick Stewart (Blunt Talk)

Season 5 (2017)
Episode 1:
 Viola Davis (Fences) with Tom Hanks (Sully)
 Molly Shannon (Other People) with Emma Stone (La La Land)
 Casey Affleck (Manchester by the Sea) with Nicole Kidman (Lion)
 Jeff Bridges (Hell or High Water) with Matthew McConaughey (Gold)

Episode 2:
 Natalie Portman (Jackie) with Michelle Williams (Manchester by the Sea)
 Amy Adams (Arrival and Nocturnal Animals) with Andrew Garfield (Hacksaw Ridge)
 Taraji P. Henson (Hidden Figures) with Ryan Reynolds (Deadpool)
 Annette Bening (20th Century Women) with Naomie Harris (Moonlight)

Episode 3:
 Colin Farrell (The Lobster) with Hugh Grant (Florence Foster Jenkins)
 Adam Driver (Paterson) with Michael Shannon (Nocturnal Animals)
 Dev Patel (Lion) with Octavia Spencer (Hidden Figures)
 Sally Field (Hello, My Name Is Doris) with Hailee Steinfeld (The Edge of Seventeen)
 Mahershala Ali (Moonlight) with Greta Gerwig (20th Century Women)

Season 6 (2017)
Episode 1:
 Sarah Jessica Parker (Divorce) with Michelle Pfeiffer (The Wizard of Lies)
 Kevin Bacon (I Love Dick) with John Lithgow (The Crown)
 Thandie Newton (Westworld) with Oprah Winfrey (The Immortal Life of Henrietta Lacks)
 Freida Pinto (Guerrilla) with Milo Ventimiglia (This Is Us)
 Lauren Graham (Gilmore Girls: A Year in the Life) with Constance Zimmer (Unreal)

Episode 2:
 Nicole Kidman (Big Little Lies) with Ewan McGregor (Fargo)
 Pamela Adlon (Better Things) with Sterling K. Brown (This Is Us)
 Anthony Anderson (Black-ish) with Kaley Cuoco (The Big Bang Theory)
 Millie Bobby Brown (Stranger Things) with Evan Rachel Wood (Westworld)
 Riz Ahmed (The Night Of) with Elisabeth Moss (The Handmaid's Tale)
 Brit Marling (The OA) with Issa Rae (Insecure)

Season 7 (2018)
Episode 1:
 Jennifer Lawrence (Mother!) with Adam Sandler (The Meyerowitz Stories)
 Gary Oldman (Darkest Hour) with Kate Winslet (Wonder Wheel)
 Jake Gyllenhaal (Stronger) with Margot Robbie (I, Tonya)
 Saoirse Ronan (Lady Bird) with Kristen Wiig (Downsizing)
 Timothée Chalamet (Call Me by Your Name) with Daniel Kaluuya (Get Out)

Episode 2:
 Gal Gadot (Wonder Woman) with Kumail Nanjiani (The Big Sick)
 Willem Dafoe (The Florida Project) with Hugh Jackman (Logan)
 Mary J. Blige (Mudbound) with Salma Hayek (Beatriz at Dinner)
 Allison Janney (I, Tonya) with Sam Rockwell (Three Billboards Outside Ebbing, Missouri)

Episode 3:
 Jessica Chastain (Molly's Game) with Holly Hunter (The Big Sick)
 Gary Oldman (Darkest Hour) with Kate Winslet (Wonder Wheel)
 Hong Chau (Downsizing) with Diane Kruger (In the Fade)
 Richard Jenkins (The Shape of Water) with Laurie Metcalf (Lady Bird)
 Jamie Bell (Film Stars Don't Die in Liverpool) with Robert Pattinson (Good Time)

Season 8 (2018)
Episode 1:
 Benedict Cumberbatch (Patrick Melrose) with Claire Foy (The Crown)
 Angela Bassett (9-1-1) with Laura Dern (The Tale)
 Darren Criss (American Crime Story) with Mandy Moore (This Is Us)
 Jason Bateman (Ozark) with Bill Hader (Barry)
 Jessica Biel (The Sinner) with Alison Brie (GLOW)

Episode 2:
 Debra Messing (Will & Grace) with Sharon Stone (Mosaic)
 Michael B. Jordan (Fahrenheit 451) with Issa Rae (Insecure)
 Jeff Daniels (The Looming Tower) with Laura Linney (Ozark)
 Tiffany Haddish (The Last O.G.) with John Legend (Jesus Christ Superstar Live in Concert)
 Edie Falco (Law & Order: True Crime) with J. K. Simmons (Counterpart)

Season 9 (2019)
Episode 1:
 Amy Adams (Vice) with Nicole Kidman (Boy Erased)
 Mahershala Ali (Green Book) with John David Washington (BlacKkKlansman)
 Darren Criss (American Crime Story) with Mandy Moore (This Is Us)
 Felicity Jones (On the Basis of Sex) with Constance Wu (Crazy Rich Asians)

Episode 2:
 Melissa McCarthy (Can You Ever Forgive Me?) with Lupita Nyong'o (Black Panther)
 Timothée Chalamet (Beautiful Boy) with Emma Stone (The Favourite)
 Emily Blunt (Mary Poppins Returns and A Quiet Place) with Hugh Jackman (The Front Runner)

Episode 3:
 John Krasinski (A Quiet Place) with Rosamund Pike (A Private War)
 Michael B. Jordan (Creed II and Black Panther) with Charlize Theron (Tully)
 Maggie Gyllenhaal (The Kindergarten Teacher) with Regina King (If Beale Street Could Talk)

Episode 4:
 Glenn Close (The Wife) with Sam Elliott (A Star Is Born)
 Armie Hammer (On the Basis of Sex and Sorry to Bother You) with Dakota Johnson (Suspiria)
 Chadwick Boseman (Black Panther) with Viggo Mortensen (Green Book)

Episode 5:
 Lady Gaga (A Star Is Born) with Lin-Manuel Miranda (Mary Poppins Returns)

Season 10
Episode 1:
 Patricia Arquette (Escape at Dannemora) with Julia Roberts (Homecoming)
 Amy Adams (Sharp Objects) with Richard Madden (Bodyguard)
 Taraji P. Henson (Empire) with Ellen Pompeo (Grey's Anatomy)

Episode 2:
 Benicio del Toro (Escape at Dannemora) with Michael Douglas (The Kominsky Method) 
 Emilia Clarke (Game of Thrones) with Regina Hall (Black Monday)
 Sam Rockwell (Fosse/Verdon) with Renée Zellweger (What/If)

Episode 3:
 Chris Pine (I Am the Night) with Robin Wright (House of Cards) 
 Patricia Clarkson (Sharp Objects) with Michelle Williams (Fosse/Verdon)
 Sacha Baron Cohen (Who Is America?) with Don Cheadle (Black Monday)

Episode 4:
 Rachel Brosnahan (The Marvelous Mrs. Maisel) with Billy Porter (Pose)
 Tracee Ellis Ross (Black-ish) with Sarah Paulson (American Horror Story)
 Natasha Lyonne (Russian Doll) with Maya Rudolph (Forever)

Season 11 (2020)
Episode 1:
 Tom Hanks (A Beautiful Day in the Neighborhood) with Renée Zellweger (Judy)
 Brad Pitt (Once Upon a Time in Hollywood) with Adam Sandler (Uncut Gems)
 Awkwafina (The Farewell) with Taron Egerton (Rocketman)

Episode 2:
 Antonio Banderas (Pain and Glory) with Eddie Murphy (Dolemite Is My Name)
 Chris Evans (Knives Out) with Scarlett Johansson (Marriage Story)
 Mindy Kaling (Late Night) with Constance Wu (Hustlers)

Episode 3:
 Adam Driver (Marriage Story) with Charlize Theron (Bombshell)
 Cynthia Erivo (Harriet) with Alfre Woodard (Clemency)
 Shia LaBeouf (Honey Boy) with Kristen Stewart (Seberg)

Episode 4:
 Jennifer Lopez (Hustlers) with Robert Pattinson (The Lighthouse)
 Sterling K. Brown (Waves) with Laura Dern (Marriage Story) 
 Beanie Feldstein (Booksmart) with Florence Pugh (Little Women)

Season 12 (2020)
Episode 1:
 Regina King (Watchmen) with Reese Witherspoon (Little Fires Everywhere)
 Anne Hathaway (Modern Love) with Hugh Jackman (Bad Education)
 Kieran Culkin (Succession) with Dan Levy (Schitt’s Creek)

Episode 2:
 Sandra Oh (Killing Eve) with Kerry Washington (Little Fires Everywhere)
 Tessa Thompson (Westworld) with Ramy Youssef (Ramy)
 Russell Crowe (The Loudest Voice) with Nicole Kidman (Big Little Lies)

Episode 3:
 Jennifer Aniston (The Morning Show) with Lisa Kudrow (Space Force, The Good Place and Feel Good)
 Daveed Diggs (Snowpiercer) with Anthony Mackie (Altered Carbon)
 Henry Cavill (The Witcher) with Patrick Stewart (Star Trek: Picard)

Episode 4:
 Claire Danes (Homeland) with Damian Lewis (Billions)
 Zendaya (Euphoria) with Mj Rodriguez (Pose)
 Chris Evans (Defending Jacob) with Paul Rudd (Living with Yourself)

Season 13 (2021)
Episode 1:

 Jodie Foster (The Mauritanian) with Anthony Hopkins (The Father)
 Riz Ahmed (Sound of Metal) with Steven Yeun (Minari)

Episode 2:
 George Clooney (The Midnight Sky) with Michelle Pfeiffer (French Exit)
 Zendaya (Malcolm & Marie) with Carey Mulligan (Promising Young Woman)
 Glenn Close (Hillbilly Elegy) with Pete Davidson (The King of Staten Island)

Episode 3:
 Ben Affleck (The Way Back) with Sacha Baron Cohen (Borat Subsequent Moviefilm and The Trial of the Chicago 7)
 Andra Day (The United States vs. Billie Holiday) with Leslie Odom Jr. (One Night in Miami)
 Jared Leto (The Little Things) with John David Washington (Malcolm & Marie)

Episode 4:
 Jamie Dornan (Wild Mountain Thyme) with Eddie Redmayne (The Trial of the Chicago 7)
 Vanessa Kirby (Pieces of a Woman) with Amanda Seyfried (Mank)
 Tom Holland (Cherry) with Daniel Kaluuya (Judas and the Black Messiah)

Season 14 (2021)
Episode 1:

 Nicole Kidman (The Undoing) with Chris Rock (Fargo)  
 Josh O'Connor (The Crown) with Anya Taylor-Joy (The Queen's Gambit)

Episode 2:
 Ewan McGregor (Halston) with Pedro Pascal (The Mandalorian)
 Kathryn Hahn (WandaVision) with Jason Sudeikis (Ted Lasso)

Episode 3:
 Kaley Cuoco (The Flight Attendant) with Elizabeth Olsen (WandaVision)
 Emma Corrin (The Crown) with Regé-Jean Page (Bridgerton)

Episode 4:
 Gillian Anderson (The Crown) with Elisabeth Moss (The Handmaid’s Tale)
 Uzo Aduba (In Treatment) with Billy Porter (Pose)

Season 15 (2022)
Episode 1:

Lady Gaga (House of Gucci) with Jake Gyllenhaal (The Guilty)
Jessica Chastain (The Eyes of Tammy Faye) with Rita Moreno (West Side Story)
Javier Bardem (Being the Ricardos) with Daniel Craig (No Time to Die)

Episode 2:
Penélope Cruz (Parallel Mothers) with Benedict Cumberbatch (The Power of the Dog)
Ariana DeBose (West Side Story) with Simu Liu (Shang-Chi and the Legend of the Ten Rings)
Oscar Isaac (The Card Counter) with Jared Leto (House of Gucci)

Episode 3:
Andrew Garfield (Tick, Tick... Boom! and The Eyes of Tammy Faye) with Rachel Zegler (West Side Story)
Aunjanue Ellis (King Richard) with Regina King (The Harder They Fall)
Jamie Dornan (Belfast) with Kirsten Dunst (The Power of the Dog)

Episode 4:
Nicole Kidman (Being the Ricardos) with Kristen Stewart (Spencer)
Marlee Matlin (CODA) with Bradley Whitford (Tick, Tick... Boom!)
Mahershala Ali (Swan Song) with Bradley Cooper (Nightmare Alley and Licorice Pizza)

Season 16 (2022)

Episode 1:

 Viola Davis (The First Lady) with Samuel L. Jackson (The Last Days of Ptolemy Grey) 
 Jennifer Aniston (The Morning Show) with Sebastian Stan (Pam & Tommy) 
 Jared Leto (WeCrashed) with Amanda Seyfried (The Dropout)  

Episode 2:

 Zendaya (Euphoria) with Andrew Garfield (Under the Banner of Heaven)  
 Cynthia Nixon (And Just Like That and The Gilded Age) with Bowen Yang (Saturday Night Live)   
 Courteney Cox (Shining Vale) with Faith Hill (1883)     

Episode 3:

 Martin Short (Only Murders in the Building) with Jean Smart (Hacks)  
 Jung Ho-yeon (Squid Game) with Sandra Oh (The Chair and Killing Eve)  
 Tom Hiddleston (The Essex Serpent and Loki) with Lily James (Pam & Tommy)   

Episode 4:

 Anne Hathaway (WeCrashed) with Jeremy Strong (Succession)  
 Christina Ricci (Yellowjackets) with Sydney Sweeney (Euphoria)  
 Quinta Brunson (Abbott Elementary with Adam Scott (Severance)
 Josh Brolin (Outer Range) with Josh Brolin

Season 17 (2023)

Episode 1:

 Cate Blanchett (Tár) with Michelle Yeoh (Everything Everywhere All at Once) 
 Kate Hudson (Glass Onion: A Knives Out Mystery) with Glen Powell (Top Gun: Maverick) 
 Laura Dern (The Son) with Michelle Williams (The Fabelmans)  

Episode 2:

 Carey Mulligan (She Said) with Margot Robbie (Babylon)   
 Austin Butler (Elvis) with Janelle Monáe (Glass Onion: A Knives Out Mystery)   
 John Boyega (The Woman King) with Letitia Wright (Black Panther: Wakanda Forever)     

Episode 3:

 Viola Davis (The Woman King) with Jennifer Lawrence (Causeway)  
 Jamie Lee Curtis (Everything Everywhere All at Once) with Colin Farrell (The Banshees of Inisherin)  
 Brendan Fraser (The Whale) with Adam Sandler (Hustle)   

Episode 4:

 Ana de Armas (Blonde) with Eddie Redmayne (The Good Nurse)  
 Paul Dano (The Fabelmans) with Brian Tyree Henry (Causeway)  
 Joe Alwyn (Stars at Noon) with Paul Mescal (Aftersun)

Cast 
The series has been hosted by Variety Deputy Awards and Features editor Jenelle Riley, Variety co-editor-in-chief Andrew Wallenstein, Variety New York bureau chief Ramin Setoodeh, Variety Film Awards Editor Clayton Davis, and Variety Chief Correspondent Elizabeth Wagmeister.

Production 
New episodes are produced twice yearly, once to align with the Academy Awards and once to align with the Emmy Awards.

Reception 
The series has been honored with a number of awards, including the 2019 Daytime Emmy Award for Outstanding Special Class Series.

References

External links 
 Official Website
 Variety Studio: Actors on Actors on IMDb

Variety (magazine)
English-language television shows
2010s American television talk shows
2014 American television series debuts
PBS original programming